Life Is Strange is a video game series that includes the eponymous title

Life Is Strange may also refer to:
Life Is Strange (video game), a video game first released in 2015

Music

Songs
"Life Is Strange", song by The Fugs, from It Crawled into My Hand, Honest 1968  
"Life Is Strange", song by rock band T. Rex from album Tanx 1973, written by Marc Bolan, and covered by several artists
"Life Is Strange", song by New Zealand band Tall Dwarfs from Fork Songs 1991
"Life Is Strange", song by American rock band Enuff Z'nuff from Tweaked 1994
"Life Is Strange", song by Marina Diamandis from Love + Fear

Other
Life Is Strange (film) 2012 American documentary film by Isaac Hertz